S. Revathi (pen name: Kutti Revathi)  is an Indian lyricist, poet, activist and doctor. She has published three books of poetry and is the editor of Panikkudam, a literary quarterly for women's writing and also the first Tamil feminist magazine. Post several literary meetings and reviewing poetry collections by fellow students, she began working on some of her own pieces.

Life
Following school, she studied Siddha medicine and got a bachelor's degree in Siddha medicine and surgery. She had been pursuing her doctoral research in medical anthropology at the Madras Institute of Development Studies in Chennai. Revathi received the Sigaram 15: Faces of Future award for literature from India Today and was awarded a travel grant in 2005 by the Sahitya Akademi to meet leading litterateurs from India. She is a contemporary Tamil poet and has published numerous controversial poetry collections.

Poems and literature
Panikkudam the first Tamil feminist magazine by her claimed varied aspects such as family, politics, business, discovery of feminine language, introducing modern play, novels, short stories and poetry created by women writers.

Interviews of women writers, introduction to modern poetry and short stories, translations of such works into Tamil from World languages, discussions of the creative process and sangam literature were some of the elements that made the part of the magazine. In the field of poetry, her first release in the year 2000 was Poonaiyai Pola Alaiyum Velicham. 

Kutti Revathi's second book, Mulaigal that was published in 2002, evoked controversy from the conservatives of the Tamil literary establishment. A group of outraged male film lyricists damned the book. The debate extended to parameters of cultural debate: obscene calls, letters and threats ensued, and comments on the author's morality were freely aired. While one lyricist demanded that writers of her types must watch out for dire consequences, the other exhorted the public to burn them on Chennai's Mount Road. However she explained, "My aim is to explore 'Mulaigal' (breasts) as an 'inhabited' living reality, rather than an 'exhibited' commodity." Adjoint to the content, an essay titled "With Words I Weave My Body", she discussed the ways in which a patriarchal tradition, fearful of sharing the power of the written word, compelled women to imprint narratives on their bodies. Her third release was Thanimaiyin Aayiram Irakkaigal in 2003.

In 2007 the English translation of her poetry Body's Door was released. Shattered Boundaries another collection of her poems in English translation was released in 2012.

Cinema
Revathi was involved in the 2013 film Maryan when the film's director Bharatbala was on the lookout for a Tamil scholar. For the same film's soundtrack album, she wrote lyrics of the melancholic song "Yenga Pona Raasa" and the track "Nenjae Ezhu". Upon the musical success of the album especially the track "Nenjae Ezhu", her lyrical styles were critically applauded. She wrote the lyrics for the song "Ennile Maha Oliyo" that was aired on MTV Coke Studio (India). And She also has written a song for the music scored by Oscar composer AR Rahman in Tamil Version of the film MOM directed by Ravi Udyawar.

Have also written lyrics for the songs in the successful films, Maya directed by Ashwin Saravanan, & 8 Thottakkal directed by Sri Ganesh. She made her directorial debut with the film Siragu.

See also
2003 in poetry
2002 in poetry

References

Indian women poets
1974 births
Living people
Indian lyricists
People from Tiruchirappalli
Indian feminists
Tamil film poets
Siddha medicine
21st-century Indian women writers
21st-century Indian poets
Poets from Tamil Nadu
Women writers from Tamil Nadu